Slaven Matan (born 17 October 1978) is a retired Swiss football goalkeeper.

References

1978 births
Living people
Swiss men's footballers
FC Basel players
BSC Young Boys players
SC Young Fellows Juventus players
Association football goalkeepers
Swiss Super League players
Switzerland under-21 international footballers